Ragged Lake is the source of Ragged Stream in the North Maine Woods. Summer dissolved oxygen concentrations are low in the deep basins. Conditions have become more favorable for fallfish and longnose sucker than for the native brook trout. Bear Brook enters the south end of the lake, and supports a spawning run of rainbow smelt. Ragged Stream flows  from the dam at the south end of Ragged Lake into the Caribou Lake arm of Chesuncook Lake.

Sources

Lakes of Piscataquis County, Maine
North Maine Woods
Penobscot River
Lakes of Maine